The Automotive Research & Testing Center (ARTC) is a government funded non-profit automotive research facility located in Lukang Township, Changhua County, Taiwan.

History 
ARTC was founded in 1990 under the auspices of the Ministry of Economic Affairs.

ARTC is one of the founding members of Taiwan Automotive Research Consortium (TARC) which was established in mid-2005.

Facilities  
ARTC's main testing facility in Changhua has twelve different test tracks on 119 hectares of land.

Research 
Among Taiwanese research institutes ARTC takes the lead on automotive intelligence, especially the development of electronics systems. In 2015 a team conducted research at ARTC on the augmentation of GNSS with laser ranging. ARTC is involved with the development of an autonomous light bus which was unveiled in September 2019. Named Winbus the platform performs at SAE Level 4 – High automation.

See also 
 Automotive industry in Taiwan
 Transportation Research Center
 Pan Asia Technical Automotive Center
 United States Army CCDC Ground Vehicle Systems Center
 International Centre for Automotive Technology
 Taiwan Textile Research Institute 
 Industrial Technology Research Institute

References 

1990 establishments in Taiwan
Automotive testing agencies
Automotive industry in Taiwan
Executive Yuan
Research institutes established in 1990
Research institutes in Taiwan